Çağan Kayra Erciyas (born 4 February 2003) is a Turkish professional footballer who plays as a centre-back for Süper Lig club Alanyaspor.

Professional career
Erciyas is a youth product of Karaağaç Efsanespor and Alanyaspor. He made his professional debut with Alanyaspor in a 1-1 Süper Lig tie with İstanbul Başakşehir on 8 January 2022. On 9 February 2022, he signed a 4-year contract keeping him at Alanyaspor.

References

External links
 

2003 births
Living people
Sportspeople from Hatay
Turkish footballers
Süper Lig players
Alanyaspor footballers
Association football defenders